Wan, or Nwa, is a Mande language of Ivory Coast. Dialects are Miamu and Kemu.

References

Mande languages
Languages of Ivory Coast